Apsua TV (Abkhazian Television) (in Abkhaz Аԥсуа Телехәаԥшра) is the state-owned television channel in Abkhazia. It broadcasts in Abkhaz and Russian languages. Its headquarters are located in Sukhumi.

History 

In the early 1970s, there were proposals for creating a television for Abkhaz population. Few years later, the committee to the State Council of Ministers of USSR Radio and Television, along with the Ministry of Communications Industry in USSR and the Ministry of Communications in USSR announced that a television organisation in Abkhaz ASSR was created. Three months were allocated for purchasing equipment and other stuff.

First transmissions started on 6 November 1976, at 7 PM, when a message in Abkhaz language appeared:  Good evening, dear Abkhaz viewers!. Then, the evening programme continued with broadcasting concerts from local music groups.

Modern Abkhazia

On September 10, 1991, the State Committee for Television and Radio of the Abkhaz ASSR changed its name to Abkhaz State Television and Radio Company.

Currently, Apsua TV broadcasts programs in Russian and Abkhaz languages.

References

Television channels and stations established in 1976
Television stations in Abkhazia
1976 establishments in Abkhazia